Peter Leslie Salsbury (born June 1949) was chief executive of Marks & Spencer from November 1998 to 2000.

References

Marks & Spencer people
Living people
Alumni of the London School of Economics
People educated at Bancroft's School
1949 births
British chief executives